Ripogonum brevifolium, commonly known as small–leaved supplejack, is a vine, or sometimes a shrub, native to Australia.

The species occurs in the states of Queensland and New South Wales.

References

brevifolium
Flora of Queensland
Flora of New South Wales